Daisuke Itō may refer to:

 Daisuke Itō (racing driver) (born 1975), Japanese racing driver
 Daisuke Itō (film director) (1898–1981), Japanese film director
 Daisuke Ito (footballer) (born 1987), Japanese football player
 Daisuke Itō (producer), Japanese producer, see Absolute Boy